Tall-e Morad Khani (also Romanized as Tall-e Morād Khānī; also known as Tall-e Ḩājjī Morād Khānī and Tall-e Morādkhān) is a village in Shurab Rural District, Veysian District, Dowreh County, Lorestan Province, Iran. At the 2006 census, its population was 111, in 19 families.

References 

Towns and villages in Dowreh County